RNIE or the Route Nationale refers to the highway system in Benin. National highways include the RNIE 1, RNIE 2, RNIE 3 (which is located in the west of the country in a north-south direction), RNIE 4, RNIE 5, RNIE 6 and RNIE 7.

Benin's main north-south highway is the RNIE 2 which runs the entire 785 km from the Niger River to Cotonou. The RNIE 2 crosses the RNIE 4 at Bohicon east of Abomey.

References

External links
Explore Benin highways at Maplandia.com
RNIE 1 AND RNIE 2 at Cotonou at Maplandia.com

Transport in Benin